Marcel Granollers and Marcin Matkowski were the defending champions, but Granollers chose to compete in Beijing instead. Matkowski played alongside Aisam-ul-Haq Qureshi, but lost in the first round to Santiago González and Julio Peralta.

Ben McLachlan and Yasutaka Uchiyama won the title, defeating Jamie Murray and Bruno Soares in the final, 6–4, 7–6(7–1).

Seeds

Draw

Draw

Qualifying

Seeds

Qualifiers
  Treat Huey /  Adil Shamasdin

Qualifying draw

References
 Main Draw
 Qualifying Draw

Rakuten Japan Open Tennis Championships - Doubles
Doubles